1970 Masters may refer to:
1970 Masters Tournament, golf
1970 Pepsi-Cola Masters, tennis